Qusai Abu Alieh is a Jordanian footballer of Palestinian origin who played as a midfielder for Al-Faisaly (Amman) and the Jordan national football team.

International career
Qusai's last international match was against Singapore on 3 March 2010 in the 2011 Asian Cup qualifying which Jordan won 2-1. He played in the last few minutes of the match after entering as a substitute for his teammate Odai Al-Saify.

Honors and Participation in International Tournaments

In AFC Asian Cups 
2004 Asian Cup

In WAFF Championships 
2004 WAFF Championship 
2007 WAFF Championship 
2008 WAFF Championship

International goals

References
 Qusai Abu Alieh: "Tha'er Jasam is the Reason Why I Left Al-Faisaly" 
 Abu Alieh Officially Signs Up for Al-Yarmouk FC 
 Abu Alieh Up to the Task of Returning to Al-Faisaly (Amman)

External links 
 
 

1978 births
Living people
Jordanian footballers
Jordan international footballers
Jordanian people of Palestinian descent
Association football midfielders
Jordanian Pro League players
Al-Faisaly SC players
Al-Jazeera (Jordan) players
Al-Yarmouk FC (Jordan) players
2004 AFC Asian Cup players
Sportspeople from Amman